Los Más Sueltos del Reggaetón is the debut studio album by Puerto Rican reggaeton duo Jowell & Randy, released on December 18, 2007, by Warner Bros.

Track listing

Chart performance
The album was not able to chart on the Billboard 200, but managed to chart on the Billboard Top Latin Albums chart at #42. The album even charted well on the Billboard Latin Rhythm Airplay chart at #6. The album was also a minor success on the Billboard Top Heatseekers chart at #21.

Charts

Certifications

References 

Jowell & Randy albums
2007 debut albums